County Road 509 or County Route 509 may refer to:

County Road 509 (Brevard County, Florida)
County Route 509 (New Jersey)